Imrich Bedecs (born 12 December 1991) is a Slovak footballer who plays for MFK Tatran Liptovský Mikuláš as a centre-back.

Club career

MFK Tatran Liptovský Mikuláš
Bedecs made his professional debut for MFK Tatran Liptovský Mikuláš against FC DAC 1904 Dunajská Streda on 17 July 2022.

References

External links
 MFK Tatran Liptovský Mikuláš official club profile 
 
 
 Futbalnet profile 

1991 births
Living people
Slovak footballers
Association football defenders
ŠK Senec players
FK Fotbal Třinec players
Czech National Football League players
Expatriate footballers in the Czech Republic
Slovak expatriate sportspeople in the Czech Republic
MFK Tatran Liptovský Mikuláš players
2. Liga (Slovakia) players
Slovak Super Liga players